Bob, Robert, Rob Barber may refer to:

 Bob Barber (American football) (born 1951), American NFL player with the Green Bay Packers
 Bob Barber (cricketer) (born 1935), English cricketer 
 Butch Barber (Robert Ian Barber, 1943–2019), Canadian ice hockey player
 Bob Barber (rugby union) (born 1945), New Zealand rugby union player
 Rob Barber, English motorcycle racer
 Robert A. Barber Jr. (born 1949), South Carolina politician
 Robert Barber (seaman) (1749–1783), Irish quartermaster
 Robert Barber (gymnast), British gymnast
 Robert C. Barber (born 1950), American attorney and U.S. Ambassador to Iceland

See also
 Robert Barbers (1944–2005), Filipino politician